World Trade Center Seoul (WTC Seoul) is a building complex centered on the COEX Convention & Exhibition Center (Coex) on Teheranno in Samseong-dong, Gangnam-gu district of Seoul. It is operated by KITA (Korea International Trade Association).

Notable Facilities
 COEX Convention & Exhibition Center
 Trade Tower
COEX Mall - underground shopping center
 COEX Aquarium
 ASEM Tower
Korea City Air Terminal
Hyundai Department Store

In popular culture
 The interior of the penthouse of the Oakwood Premier COEX Center was used as a filming location for the Paris home, in the first three episode, of male lead, Han Ki-joo played by Park Shin-yang, in Seoul Broadcasting System (SBS)'s drama Lovers in Paris.
Legally Blonde, The Musical: 16 November 2012 to 17 March 2013, CoexArtium, starring Jung Eun-ji of A Pink.

Administration
The  section of sidewalk along Yeongdong Boulevard from exit No.5 of Samseong Station on Seoul Subway Line 2, outside Convention & Exhibition Center and ASEM Tower is designated as a smoke-free zone by the Seoul Metropolitan Government.

References

External links 

 COEX - Official Website
 Official website of the Oakwood Premier
 Kmall24 - Online store operated by KITA (Korea International Trade Association)

 
Buildings and structures in Gangnam District
Skyscraper hotels in South Korea
Skyscraper office buildings in Seoul